The Georgia Apple Festival is an annual festival in Ellijay, Georgia. The festival has been held every October since 1971 and offers handmade crafts, live music, and apples. An annual parade and antique car show are also held in conjunction with the festival.

History
After the boll weevil came through and destroyed Georgia's cotton crops in the 1920s, Gilmer County's economy was bolstered by its apple orchards. A festival to celebrate the apples and what they did for the county  during the hard times created by the loss of the cotton crop was first held in 1971.

The only cancellation occurred in 2020.

Apples and Attractions
There are over 300 vendors and exhibitions. The vendor booths include candles, homemade hats, woodwork, crafts, food, and blacksmith and glass blowing exhibits. Apple fritters, pies, and other apple treats are the face of the Georgia apple festival. The hundreds of booths feature craftsmen and artisans from throughout the Southeastern United States.

References

External links

Festivals in Georgia (U.S. state)
Food and drink festivals in the United States
Tourist attractions in Gilmer County, Georgia
Festivals established in 1971
October events
Apple festivals
1971 establishments in Georgia (U.S. state)